Balboa Academy is an international, coeducational, college-preparatory school that offers a US curriculum education for Pre-kindergarten through the 12th grade. The language of instruction is English.

Balboa Academy was established in Ciudad del Saber, Panama City, Panama, in August 1999 by a team of educators. Balboa Academy students represent a diversity of economic, social, and cultural backgrounds.

Balboa Academy is administered by a director.

See also 
 List of international schools

References

External links 
 

International schools in Panama
American international schools in North America
Educational institutions established in 1999
1999 establishments in Panama